"Touch, Peel and Stand" is a song by the rock band Days of the New and the lead single from their self-titled debut album. It was released in 1997 and remains arguably the band's most popular and well known song. The song reached #1 on the Billboard Hot Mainstream Rock Tracks chart and retained the spot for a then-record sixteen weeks. Shortly after this success, the song rose to #6 on the Billboard Hot Modern Rock Tracks chart, becoming their first Top 10 hit on the chart.

"Touch, Peel and Stand" is known for its raw, acoustic feel and maintains considerable radio play to this day. Despite the fact that Travis Meeks writes the majority of the songs by Days of the New, and considers it his own personal project, he has praised Matt Taul's cymbal-heavy percussion in the song. In a 2008 interview, Meeks noted, "As far as I’m concerned, he owns the track."

The cover art of the "Touch, Peel and Stand" CD single borrows a photograph from the band's debut album liner notes. This depicts the Wrestling Superstars figure of George "The Animal" Steele. The rubber figure is heavily battered with both his head and left arm torn off.

Music video
The music video for "Touch, Peel and Stand", directed by Frank W. Ockenfels 3,  has a disgruntled young man (Lead Singer Travis Meeks' friend Levi Sulivan) watching TV in a filthy, rundown house. On the TV screen, the band is performing the song in a gray, open-spaced room and appears to acknowledge the man through the screen. He eventually becomes enraged and tosses furniture around the room before entering the bathroom and cutting off his long hair and shaving his head bald. Photos of the band are seen throughout his house. The man is eventually seen, with clothes neatly tucked in, facing a closed curtain while the band continues to perform in the TV screen.

Appearances
The song was performed live on the Late Show with David Letterman on November 28, 1997.

"Touch, Peel and Stand" was featured on compilations like X-Games, Vol. 3 in 1998, Shine! in 2000, and Total Rock and Crossing All Over, Vol. 7 in 2002.  It can also be found on the soundtrack to Hitman Hart: Wrestling with Shadows released in 1999 and Days of the New: The Definitive Collection released March 2008.

The song appeared in the ninth episode of Dawson's Creek, originally airing on March 17, 1998.

In January 2006, the song was featured in a TV commercial for TLC's reality television program Beyond the Bull.

Track listings
The CD single, released in 1998, also includes two B-sides, "Independent Slaves" and "Got to be You." The former was also included on the Crow: Salvation soundtrack while the latter appeared on 2 Guitars, Bass & Drums: Songs For Survival.

"Touch, Peel and Stand"
"Independent Slaves"
"Got to Be You"

Charts

References

1997 debut singles
Days of the New songs
Song recordings produced by Scott Litt
Songs written by Travis Meeks
1997 songs
1998 singles